Euronav is a Belgian international shipping enterprise which focuses on oil transport by sea. Euronav is considered to be one of the major independent global oil shipping firms.

Euronav is in the process of merging with another leading oil tanker operator, Frontline Ltd., controlled by the John Fredriksen group. This merger, if executed, should be implemented in 2023.

History 
Euronav provides complete shipping services in addition to its fleet of large tankers. The company is the successor to the Belgium tanker-owner European Navigation Company Ltd, an Isle of Man company, and to the French Compagnie Nationale de Navigation (CNN, at that time a subsidiary of the Worms Group (Worms & Cie).  In 1995 European Navigation Company Ltd sold vessels, subsidiary, crewing and technical, management companies and goodwill to Euronav Luxembourg NV to form a joint venture between CNN and Compagnie Maritime Belge (CMB).  In 1997 CMB acquired CNN and transferred Euronav Luxembourg NV into the full ownership of CMB. Euronav had thus become the wholly owned tanker division of CMB.

At the time CMB was and continues to be controlled by the Belgian family Saverys.

On 5 January 2014 Euronav announced that it has entered into a contract to acquire 15 VLCC tankers from Maersk subsidiary Maersk Tankers Singapore in a deal worth US$980 million.[10] This deal will bring the number of ships from Euronav from thirtyfive to fifty.[11]

In December 2017, it became known that Euronav took over its American competitor, Gener8 Maritime. The take over will take form of a merger by moving all Gener8's shares under Euronav's umbrella with Gener8 becoming a daughter company. Euronav will have 72 percent of the shares, compared to 28 percent for the Gener8 stockholders. The new group will have a fleet of 75 tankers, including 44 VLCC's.[12][13]

On 11 September 2020, Euronav was granted a $713m loan facility by Nordea with the first withdrawal on 15 October 2020. It consists of a revolving credit facility of up to $469m and a term loan of up to $244m.

On 7 April 2022 there was announced a merger between Euronav and Frontline Ltd. pending regulatory approval and ironing out of the last details, including different strategic views between Euronav and Frontline main owners.

Fleet management 
Technically, the fleet management is conducted by three wholly owned subsidiaries Euronav Ship Management SA and Euronav SAS, both French companies with headquarters in Nantes, France, and with a major branch office in Antwerp, Belgium, and Euronav Ship Management (Hellas) Ltd. with branch office in Athens, Greece. Euronav vessels fly Belgian, French, Greek and Liberian flag. 

Commercially, most of Euronav's VLCCs and two or three V-Plus are marketed in the Tankers International pool of oil tanker operators.

References

External links

 Website of Euronav

Companies based in Antwerp
Oil and gas companies of Belgium
Companies in the BEL Mid Index
Companies listed on the New York Stock Exchange